Bundoo is a parenting website that publishes articles on pregnancy, pediatrics, and parenting. It provides an ask-the-doctor service through Ask Bundoo. 

Bundoo's target audience is expecting parents and parents. The site's beta version went live in summer 2013, followed by the full site roll-out in January 2014.

History 
Bundoo was created by Lewis Warshauer, MD, a retired radiologist. The company was headquartered in Boca Raton, Florida.

In 2015, Bundoo named Stephanie Winans CEO. Winans was previously COO and comes from a background in radio and media.

In November 2016, Bundoo was acquired by The Wellness Network.

Publications
Bundoo publishes original articles, interviews, and videos on pregnancy and parenting issues. All the company's core content is reviewed or written by a doctor or qualified parenting professional. Bundoo also answers parenting and pregnancy questions directly through a Telehealth component.

Awards and media 
In 2015, Bundoo was named a honoree in the Webby Awards in the Parenting category. Bundoo was also named a Silver award winner in the 2014 W3 Awards for excellence in web design, sponsored by the Academy of Interactive and Visual Arts. Bundoo was featured in Marketing Sherpa for its successful use of third-party platforms to improve site metrics.

Articles featuring Bundoo experts or profiles of the site were published by the Huffington Post, Fox News, the New York Times, the South-Florida Sun Sentinel, Scholastic Parent & Child, and local television and radio stations in Canada and the United States.

References 

Parenting websites
American health websites
Telehealth
Maternity in the United States